Will Kuluva (May 2, 1917 – November 6, 1990) was an American actor. He appeared in the films Abandoned, Viva Zapata!, Operation Manhunt, The Shrike, Crime in the Streets, Odds Against Tomorrow, Go Naked in the World, The Spiral Road and The Missiles of October. He appeared in the television series The Untouchables, The Twilight Zone, The Man from U.N.C.L.E., Hawaii Five-O, Perry Mason, It Takes a Thief, Primus, Mission: Impossible, and Quincy, M.E., among others.

He died on November 6, 1990, in Bequia, Saint Vincent and the Grenadines at age 73.

Filmography

References

External links
 
 
 

1917 births
1990 deaths
20th-century American male actors
American male film actors
American male television actors
Male actors from Kansas City, Missouri